Earth Defense, credited as The Earth Defend on title screen, is an unlicensed game for the Sega Mega Drive/Genesis; it was developed by AV Artisan and published by Realtec in both North America and Taiwan, without a license from Sega.

The game cartridge and box shapes as well as quality in graphics and box art are identical to AV Artisan's previous titles Funny World & Balloon Boy and Mallet Legend's Whac-a-Critter, both published by Realtec. Earth Defense was also rare in that it was a simultaneous 2 player vertical scrolling shoot 'em up on the Genesis which primarily featured single player shoot 'em ups. The player takes on the role of a jet pilot assigned to liberate five world continents from a technologically advanced army.

Weapons
Players had two different types of weapons to choose from during combat. A vulcan/spread shot weapon and a wave/beam shot weapon. Rather than possessing bomb-like items, the players had a shield item that made the ship temporarily invulnerable.

Levels
Stage 1: Brazil, South America

Stage 2: Washington, North America

Stage 3: Siberia, Russia

Stage 4: China, Asia

Stage 5: Nigeria, Africa

Compatibility Issues
The game cannot be played through a Sega 32X. The game must be put directly into the Sega Genesis' cartridge slot. When the game is inserted into a Sega 32X, the RealTec logo will show up, but the Sega Genesis will keep resetting itself. The game will not run at all on the Majesco Sega Genesis 3.

Notes and references
Earth Defense at GameFAQs

1995 video games
Sega Genesis games
Sega Genesis-only games
Unauthorized video games
Video games developed in Taiwan
Video games set in the United States
Video games set in Africa
Video games set in Russia
Multiplayer and single-player video games